Maria Wolfbrandt (born 18 March 1979) is a former professional tennis player from Sweden.

She won ten singles and eleven doubles titles on the ITF Circuit. On 3 February 2003, she achieved her best singles ranking of world No. 219. On 25 August 2003, she peaked at No. 180 in the doubles rankings.

Playing for Sweden in Fed Cup, Wolfbrandt has a win–loss record of 5–3.

She retired from professional tennis 2007.

ITF Circuit finals

Singles: 17 (10–7)

Doubles: 20 (11–9)

References

External links
 
 
 

1979 births
Living people
Swedish female tennis players
20th-century Swedish women
21st-century Swedish women